Swords and Hearts is a 1911 American silent drama film directed by D. W. Griffith and released by the Biograph Company.

Plot summary
Hugh Frazier, a Confederate officer during the American Civil War, is trailed by Union soldiers while stopping to visit his sweetheart Irene Lambert. Jenny Baker, a poor young woman who is a not-so-secret admirer of the officer, puts on his overcoat and takes his horse and rides away, causing the Union soldiers to follow. After the war, Jenny and Hugh are reunited.

Cast
Wilfred Lucas as Hugh Frazier
Claire McDowell as Irene Lambert
Dorothy West as Jenny Baker
William J. Butler as Old Ben
Charles West as The Suitor
Verner Clarges as Hugh's Father
Francis J. Grandon as Jennie's Father
Alfred Paget as Bushwacker
Donald Crisp as Bushwacker
Kate Bruce as At Lambert House (uncredited)
Donald Crisp as At Frazier House / Bushwacker (uncredited)
Frank Evans as Bushwhacker (uncredited)
Guy Hedlund as At Frazier House / Union Soldier (uncredited)
Florence La Badie as Undetermined Role (uncredited)
J. Jiquel Lanoe as Union Soldier / Bushwhacker (uncredited)
Charles Hill Mailes as Bushwhacker (uncredited)
W. Chrystie Miller as Minor Role (uncredited)

Commentary
Jenny Baker is fearless after she dons the officer's overcoat and takes his horse to divert the Union soldiers. Her horsemanship is emphasized over the other male riders, as soon as she is on the horse she rides at full speed and she alone among the riders has her horse rear up on its hind legs.

Preservation
Copies of Swords and Hearts are held by the Museum of Modern Art and BFI National Archive.

References

External links

1911 films
1910s war drama films
American Civil War films
American war drama films
American silent short films
Biograph Company films
American black-and-white films
Articles containing video clips
1911 drama films
Films directed by D. W. Griffith
1910s English-language films
1910s American films
Silent American drama films
Silent war drama films